List of media in Minnesota shows media by city in the U.S. state of Minnesota.  Media includes newspapers, radio stations, and television stations.  All county seats and cities with media sections are shown.

Media companies and associations
 Minnesota Public Television Association

See also
 List of newspapers in Minnesota
 List of Minnesota Public Radio affiliates
 List of radio stations in Minnesota
 List of television stations in Minnesota

 Media
 Media
 Media
 Media
 Media
 Media